The 2020–21 season is Aquila Basket Trento's 27th in existence and the club's 9th consecutive season in the top tier Italian basketball.

Players

Current roster

Depth chart

Squad changes

In

|}

Out

|}

Confirmed 

|}

Coach

On loan

Competitions

Supercup

References 

2021–22 in Italian basketball by club
2021–22 EuroCup Basketball by club